The 1974–75 Princeton Tigers men's basketball team represented the Princeton University in intercollegiate college basketball during the 1974–75 NCAA Division I men's basketball season. The head coach was Pete Carril and the team co-captains were Armond Hill and Michael Steuerer. The team played its home games in the Jadwin Gymnasium on the University campus in Princeton, New Jersey, and was the runner-up of the Ivy League and champion of the 16-team 1975 National Invitation Tournament.

The team won its last thirteen games and posted a 22-8 overall record and a 12-2 conference record. The team won the National Invitation Tournament held at New York City's Madison Square Garden by defeating the  84–63 on March 16, 1975, the  86–67 on March 20, the  58–57 on March 22 and the  80–69 on March 23. This was the school's first and only post season tournament championship.

During the season, the team spent the final two weeks of the seventeen-week season ranked in the Associated Press Top Ten Poll, peaking at number eight and ending the season ranked number twelve. The team also finished the season ranked number twelve in the final UPI Coaches' Poll.

Armond Hill, who led the Ivy League in free throw percentage with an 81.1% average, was selected to the All-Ivy League first team.  Tim van Blommesteyn, who set the Ivy League single-season steals record (72) that Hill would break the following year, was selected in the 1975 NBA Draft by the New York Knicks with the 153rd overall selection in the 9th Round.  On January 11, 1975, against , Steurer made all twelve of his free throws to find his way into the Ivy League's record books although short of Bill Bradley's perfect 16 free throw night and the Ivy League record of 21.

Regular season
The team posted a 22-8 (12-2 Ivy League) record.

! = South Carolina Classic at Columbia, S.C.
@ = NIT at New York

Home games in CAPS

Rankings

NIT tournament
The team won the 1975 National Invitation Tournament.

National Invitation Tournament
3/16/75 at Madison Square Garden: Princeton 84, Holy Cross 63
3/20/75 at Madison Square Garden: Princeton 86, So. Carolina 67
3/22/75 at Madison Square Garden: Princeton 58, Oregon 57

NIT CHAMPIONSHIP GAME
3/23/75 at Madison Square Garden: Princeton 80, Providence 69

Awards and honors
 Armond Hill
 First Team All-Ivy League
 All-East
 Barnes Hauptfuhrer
 Second Team All-Ivy League
 Mickey Steuerer
 Honorable Mention All-Ivy League
 Tim van Blommsteyn
 Honorable Mention All-Ivy League

Team players drafted into the NBA
Three players from this team were selected in the NBA Draft.

References

Princeton Tigers men's basketball seasons
National Invitation Tournament championship seasons
Princeton Tigers
Princeton
Princeton Tigers
Princeton Tigers